Wymondley is a civil parish in Hertfordshire, England. 

The parish was created on 1 April 1937 as a merger of the two former parishes of Great Wymondley and Little Wymondley. Prior to the creation of North Hertfordshire in 1974, Wymondley was part of Hitchin Rural District.

The population of the civil parish as of the 2011 census is 1,153.

Wymondley was once the location of a dissenting academy for the education of future nonconformist ministers. The academy was active during 1799-1833 and went under various names, including Wymondley College.

Governance

North Hertfordshire District Council

Wymondley Parish is located within the local government district of North Hertfordshire. The principal settlements of the Parish are Little Wymondley and the smaller Great Wymondley, as well as the hamlets of Todd's Green and Titmore Green.

Wymondley forms part of Chesfield Ward; A Multi Member Ward represented by two Councillors (Cllr George Davies (Conservative) and Cllr Terry Tyler (Liberal Democrat))

Hertfordshire County Council
Wymondley is located within the Hertfordshire County Council Division of Knebworth and Codicote and is represented by Cllr Richard Thake (Conservative).

Parliamentary Representation

The Parish is represented in Parliament by Bim Afolami MP (Conservative) who was first elected as the MP for Hitchin and Harpenden in 2017.

References

External links

Wymondley Parish Council

Civil parishes in Hertfordshire
North Hertfordshire District